Lavender Castle (also known as Gerry Anderson's Lavender Castle) is a British stop motion/CGI science fantasy television series created by Rodney Matthews and produced by Gerry Anderson. It was produced in 1997 through a collaboration between Carrington Productions International and Cosgrove Hall Films, and was first broadcast on CITV from 1999 to 2000.

The series follows the story of Captain Thrice and his crew, on a quest to find the peaceful city of Lavender Castle before the evil Dr. Agon.

Series overview
Lavender Castle is a place of mystery and legend, fabled throughout the universe, a floating city of light, a place of peace, harmony and all the things that have ever been dreamt of. It is the centre of the universe and the greatest source of power - should it be destroyed, the universe would be plunged into darkness forever. Evil scientist Dr Agon plans to do just that. A lonely megalomaniac with technology-assisted powers of transmutation, he yearns for darkness and has pledged to destroy Lavender Castle from his fortress spaceship, the Dark Station, the most destructive power in the universe, crewed by unseen slaves working deep in the bowels.

In order to prevent this, Captain Thrice has set out on a quest to find the elusive Lavender Castle before Agon does and protect it at the same time. A previous encounter with Lavender Castle gave life to Thrice's walking stick and left the Captain with a special knowledge of its power and abilities. Travelling in his cottage spaceship, the Paradox, Thrice assembles a crew of misfits to join him in his quest, combating evil wherever they find it as they travel the universe searching for clues that will lead them to Lavender Castle. But Lavender Castle works in mysterious ways and lends its power to the Paradox crew to protect them when they most need help.

Characters

Protagonists 

 Captain Thrice: the wise, elderly three-eyed captain of the Paradox, always accompanied by his talking, sentient walking stick. Years before, he fortuitously came across Lavender Castle during his space travels, and since that time, is bent on finding it again to try and protect it from Dr. Agon. Voiced by David Holt.
 Walking Stick: Captain Thrice's talking, sentient walking stick, who was given life when Thrice previously came across Lavender Castle. She maintains a link with the castle, and at desperate moments, she can produce a lavender ray to neutralise even the toughest of opponents. Voiced by Kate Harbour.
 Roger: An Australander who is the Paradoxs pilot, anciently a Starfighter pilot in the Space Force, then a freelance mercenary and space freighter pilot before being captured by Short Fred Ledd, along with his last passenger Lyca. Talented and heroic, but also reckless and gung-ho, Roger has a tendency to act before thinking, which sometimes leads the whole crew into troubles. He seems often bent on impressing the lovely Lyca, but fails most of the time. Voiced by Rob Rackstraw.
 Isambard: Captain Thrice's first mate and engineer, in charge of the Paradoxs engines. A brilliant mechanic, his methods are however rather unorthodox (for instance, whacking the central engine with his hammer to make it work is always a viable solution for him). He is very proud of his position and refers to the Paradoxs engine as his "baby". He also invented many gadgets in the past; "some of them even work", according to him. He is named after Isambard Kingdom Brunel, an important figure of the Industrial Revolution. Sometime before the series started, Isambard had his own ship which he accidentally blew up, and was rescued by Captain Thrice shortly after. Voiced by Rob Rackstraw.
 Lyca: The Paradoxs Floran doctor, a medical student, a talented healer, and an adept of herbal medicine, who joined the crew after being freed from Short Fred Ledd along with Roger. Lyca is a very sweet and gentle soul, but she is also far removed from the classic Damsel in Distress stereotype, being on the contrary quite brave and adventurous. She is very protective of Sproggle and tends to see him as a little brother. Voiced by Kate Harbour.
 Sir Squeakalot: A robot designed to look like a knight's suit of armour, but who behaves more like a mild-mannered and nervous servant. He is the Paradoxs housekeeper, originally owned by Queen Zarla before her ship, the QZ3, was sunk and he was captured by Short Fred Ledd. Somewhat phlegmatic and refined, he is much of a gentleman and speaks in a distinguished English accent. He tends to be moderately nervous around Isambard, who seems often bent on having him test his new inventions. As well as being Squeakalot's former owner, Queen Zarla also knighted Squeakalot for his outstanding ability to reason. Voiced by Jimmy Hibbert.
 Sproggle: The Paradoxs lovable but extremely incompetent navigator, who would like to define himself as such, while he can hardly make apart his left from his right.  Originally an orphaned child who served as Short Fred Ledd's navigator in the Cutting Snark's crows nest before being rescued by Captain Thrice. Gentle, naïve and easily bewildered, Sproggle also has a somewhat simplistic syntax, usually speaking in third person and with very few words. "Oooooh... Sproggle scared!" seems to be one of his favourite expressions. He has the ability to see through Dr. Agon's many disguises and also unknowingly carries the final clue to finding Lavender Castle. Voiced by David Holt.

Antagonists 

 Dr. Cedric Agon: The series' main antagonist, an evil, megalomaniac mad scientist and orphan whose many years of being bullied have warped his mind on destroying Lavender Castle, and thus plunging the whole universe into darkness and despair forever. Self-proclaiming himself "Destroyer of Planets and Terror of the Universe", he constantly travels in pursuit of the Paradox and its crew, aboard the Dark Station, his own gigantic, heavily armed space fortress manned by an unseen crew of slaves imprisoned into the ship's bowels. Voiced by Jimmy Hibbert.
 Trump: Dr. Agon's pet and sidekick, a flying critter resembling a cross between a bat and a lizard with a trumpet-like face. Capable of talking, Trump also enjoys emitting sarcastic raspberry sounds now and then. He also seems to strongly dislike his own name, and is irritated when Agon calls him by it. Voiced by Jimmy Hibbert.
 Short Fred Ledd: A one-legged, dim-witted space pirate who roams galactic ether streams in his galleon-shaped craft, the Cutting Snark.  He often uses a pair of crutches to move around, though being perfectly able to stand on his unique leg all the same. Mean, greedy and rancorous, he is bent on hijacking the Paradox and selling its crew as slaves, which occasionally drives him to work for Dr. Agon. Even though Agon holds him in undisguised contempt, he invites him to the Dark Station in Birds of a Feather. Voiced by Jimmy Hibbert.
 Tin Lizzy: Short Fred Ledd's mechanical parrot. She is shown to have the ability to remotely reprogram Sir Squeakalot in The Traitor, but is more commonly seen annoying Ledd by repeating everything that he says. She was named after the band Thin Lizzy, who Rodney Matthews designed album covers for. A 'tin lizzie' was also a nickname for a Ford Model T. Voiced by David Holt.
 Colonel Clump: An android created at the same factory which produced Sir Squeakalot. Although intended to serve his creators, a faulty master-switch caused him to become evil and escape. He takes over a space supermarket in The Collector, and uses it as a base from which to amass a collection of various lifeforms frozen in suspended animation. His one encounter with the Paradox crew ends with Sir Squeakalot (who knew about his faulty circuit) damaging his controls and dropping him down a waste disposal chute, though Birds of a Feather reveals that he recovered and still resides in the supermarket. Voiced by David Holt.
 The Guardian: A mysterious alien thief of obscure origin. He wears a metal helmet which obscures his face so that he won't hypnotise himself. In The Twilight Tower, he attempts to trap some of the Paradox crew in the eponymous tower, though is thwarted by Sir Squeakalot, resulting in the Tower's destruction. In Raiders of the Planet Zark, he attempts to trick the Paradox crew into retrieving the elusive Lavender Compass. It is implied that he has multiple lives, having survived the destruction of the Twilight Tower and also surviving being crushed by a huge block of stone. He is the only antagonist not present at Dr Agon's meeting in Birds of a Feather. Voiced by Rob Rackstraw.
 Mr Dank: This may not be his actual name because his race are called Danks. Sproggle calls him Big Froggle (probably as an insult) and Captain Thrice uses Mr Dank (probably as a courtesy). He has four arms, speaks with a stereotypical Deep South accent and lives in a large wooden house overlooking a swamp (the house is revealed to also be a spacecraft in Birds of a Feather). He has a long tongue resembling that of a frog or chameleon (he professes himself to be 'the fastest tongue in the West'). Vain and selfish, he subsists on Dank Juice, a drink made from the leaves of the Wumbo plant and apprehends any trespassers who might steal it. In Swamp Fever, he captures Lyca when she attempts to gather the leaves to heal Captain Thrice, though is outwitted by Sproggle. In Duelling Banjos, he loses a banjo-picking contest with Captain Thrice and with ill grace helps the Paradox crew to refuel their ship with Dank Juice. He attends Dr Agon's meeting in Birds of a Feather (where he is still not given a confirmed name). Voiced by Jimmy Hibbert.

Other characters 

 The Twaddle Twins: A pair of alien traders, the two one-legged brothers are named Dim and Duff. They are identical in appearance, though wear different-shaped hats and different coloured neckties (Dim's being dark green and Duff's lilac). They are somewhat unscrupulous, being easily swayed by money, and often acquire their goods from dubious sources. They possess the powers of teleportation, which they often use to transport and steal things (including the Paradoxs MD-646 engine in Double Cross). Despite their dubious morals, they usually prove to be allies of the Paradox crew. Voiced by Jimmy Hibbert (Twaddle Dim) and Rob Rackstraw (Twaddle Duff).
 Doodlebug: The owner of the space supermarket taken over by Colonel Clump. He is placed in suspended animation by Clump, though is rescued by Sir Squeakalot, Lyca and Roger. Whilst it is stated that he will recover from the experience, he presumably set up business elsewhere because Clump is still at the supermarket in Birds of a Feather. He is the only character not to have a voice.
 Wearizy: An invisible Terrian dog which is briefly owned by Sproggle in Wearizy. He comes from an invisible planet. He is capable of turning from a Terrian into a ferocious Doberoid, which Dr Agon learns to his detriment. Voiced by Rob Rackstraw.
 The President of Flora: A Floran who rules the planet Flora. He is not actually seen in the episode he appears in, which is Collision Course, due to the Paradoxs TransVision being broken. Voiced by Jimmy Hibbert.
 The Nice Old Lady: A disguise often used by Dr. Agon in order to get the crew's attention. She is easily identifiable as one of Agon's disguises due to her purple clothing. Voiced by Kate Harbour.

Planets
Thestal: A barren desert planet, the location of the Twaddle Twins' business.

Quagmire: A planet of swamps and bogs, populated by the Danks.

Flora: Lyca's home planet. It is threatened by an asteroid in Collision Course.

Zark: A seemingly uninhabited planet of dense forests and violent weather. It is the location of the Mountain of Morg where the Lavender Compass is hidden.

Icester: A seemingly uninhabited planet of ice and snow. It is the location of the Icester Diamond, which Short Fred Ledd tries to steal.

Brightonia on Sea: A tropical planet which is a popular holiday destination.

The Dragon's Planet: A planet populated by giant carnivorous plants. The name may not be real, as it is revealed to be part of a trick by Dr Agon (with Dragon's Planet rendered as Dr Agon's Planet).

Trimbo: A seemingly uninhabited desert planet, the location of a couple of twin peaks where the Paradox once ended up trapped.

Bharron: A seemingly uninhabited desert planet, where Lavender Castle can be sighted once every thousand years when the two suns of the planet eclipse.

Themea: A planet of jungles and mountains. It is the location of the Galactic Park, which is supposedly run by Twaddle Duff and only has one ride - a ghost train.

Barrenette: A desert planet supposedly inhabited by aliens who were the victims of a massacre. However, it was revealed to be part of a trick by Dr. Agon.

Australand: This planet isn't actually seen in the series, but according to one of the special features on the DVD, it's Roger's home planet.

Toma: This planet isn't actually seen in the series, but according to the series bible, it is the location of the Laplon tree, which Captain Thrice's Walking Stick was carved from.

Many of the planets seen in the series are not named in-show, but the names are seen in the scripts and series bible.

Machines & Vehicles
The Paradox: A half-timbered, thatched cottage spaceship, home to Captain Thrice and his crew as they search the universe for Lavender Castle. What it lacks in gunnery, it makes up for in speed and agility. It's powered by an MD-646 engine, which in turn is operated by Isambard, who usually makes it work by whacking it with a wooden hammer.

The Firefly: Roger's old Starfighter. As well as carrying passengers, it can also carry cargo. However, it meets its end at the hands of Dr. Agon, when it is destroyed by his Dark Station.
 
The Dark Station: The most awesome destructive power in the universe. Captained by Dr. Agon, it has an inexhaustible supply of fuel thanks to its 1001 Unseen Slaves. It can even trigger the destruction of a sun with its lasers. There are times, however, when the Dark Station proves to be too big to reach its destination, which is when Dr. Agon uses...

The Mammoth Machine: A versatile spacecraft resembling an elephant, and even makes an elephant's trumpet sound. It is powered by steam, and can travel on land, underwater and through outer space. Its weapons include missiles, lasers, a harpoon and Leech bolts.

The Giant Mechanical Spider: A giant remote controlled robot belonging to Dr. Agon, shaped like a spider. Its known abilities include being able to weave a steel web, and crushing its prey with its pincers.

The Cutting Snark: Short Fred Ledd's pirate galleon. It sails across ether streams that are scattered throughout space. Like The Dark Station, it has slaves working in the ship's depths - but unlike the Dark Station, the Cutting Snark's slaves are robots. Its only weapons are a pair of laser cannons, and the ship contains a rowboat that Ledd uses to get to planets that don't have ether streams.

Episodes

Series 1

Cancelled Series 2
A second season was planned in advance of the broadcast of the first series, and had already been commissioned by CITV. 26 scripts had been written by Gerry Anderson, Pauline Fisk, Chris Trengove, Jimmy Hibbert and Marco Palmer. For this 2nd season, the CGI sequences would have been animated by Nelvana in Canada. It also would've been likely to introduce new characters alongside the regular cast. However, Carrington Productions International, the financiers of the show, were absorbed into Entertainment Rights (now DreamWorks Classics) in 2000, and although their successors made several attempts to get the 2nd season off the ground, the plans would ultimately be dropped the following year.

CITV repeated the first 8 episodes during mid 2005.

Credits
From an Original Concept by Rodney Matthews
Produced at Cosgrove Hall Films Limited
Produced by: Gerry Anderson
Executive Producer: Craig Hemmings
For Cosgrove Hall: Brian Cosgrove
Directed by: Chris Taylor
Designed by: Rodney Matthews
Line Producer: Chris Bowden
Scripts by: Gerry Anderson, Chris Trengove, Pauline Fisk
Stories by: Gerry Anderson, Rodney Matthews, Craig Hemmings, Chris Trengove, Pauline Fisk
Music Composed by: Crispin Merrell
Dialogue Recording Services Provided by: AlfaSound, AngelSound, The Bridge
Puppets Built at: Mackinnon & Saunders
Supervising Animator: Sue Pugh
Animation by: Tim Collings, Matt Palmer, Lisa Goddard, Justin Exley, Stuart Sutcliffe, Monica McCartney, Tobias Fouracre, Phil Dale, Barry Purves, Bill Martin, Haydn Secker, Lucy Gell, David Grove, Andy Joule, Mike Cottee
Sets by: Jeff Spain, Richard Sykes, Rick Kent, Paul Jones, Samantha Hanks, Nick Wilson
Props by: Owen Ballhatchet, Jon Fletcher, Alison Davies
Costumes by: Clare Elliott, Geraldine Corrigan, Karen Betty, Barbara Biddulph
Visual FX by: Stephen Weston
Visual FX Assistant: Manfred-Dean Yurke
Art Direction by: Peter Hillier
Lighting Camera: Joe Dembinski, Tim Harper
Edited by: Zyggy Markiewicz
Off-line Editing: Flix Facilities
Production Manager: Laura Duncalf
Production Controller: Phil Slattery
Production Co-ordinator: Mary Anderson
Production Assistant: Debbie Peers
Audio Post Production Services Provided by: Hullabaloo Studios
On-line Editing Facilities: 4:2:2 Manchester

References

External links

Rodney Matthews' website
Toonhound.com Entry

1990s British children's television series
1999 British television series debuts
1999 British television series endings
1990s British animated television series
British children's animated space adventure television series
British children's animated science fantasy television series
British computer-animated television series
British stop-motion animated television series
Fictional spacecraft
English-language television shows
ITV children's television shows
Television series by Cosgrove Hall Films
Television series by Universal Television
Animated television series about extraterrestrial life